Lukas Müller (born 19 May 1987 in Wetzlar) is a German former representative rower. He is an Olympian, an Olympic gold medallist and was twice a world champion.

He was in the crew that won the gold medal at the men's eight competition at the 2012 Summer Olympics in London. Later that year each member of the crew was awarded the Silbernes Lorbeerblatt (Silver Laurel Leaf), Germany's highest sports award, for the achievement.

References 

 

1987 births
Living people
People from Wetzlar
Sportspeople from Giessen (region)
Rowers at the 2012 Summer Olympics
Olympic rowers of Germany
Olympic medalists in rowing
Olympic gold medalists for Germany
Medalists at the 2012 Summer Olympics
World Rowing Championships medalists for Germany
German male rowers
Recipients of the Silver Laurel Leaf